Sveta Helena may refer to:

 Sveta Helena, Zagreb County, a village near Sveti Ivan Zelina, Croatia
 Sveta Helena, Koprivnica-Križevci County, a village near Križevci, Croatia